Brian Delance Johnson (born February 16, 1987) is an American football coach and former quarterback who is the offensive coordinator for the Philadelphia Eagles of the National Football League (NFL). He previously served as the quarterbacks coach for the Eagles from 2021 to 2022 and also served as an assistant coach at the University of Florida, University of Houston, Mississippi State University and University of Utah.

Johnson played college football at Utah and was drafted by the New York Sentinels in the UFL Premiere Season Draft in 2009.

Early years
Johnson was born to parents Stacey and Shonna Johnson of Barrett Station, Texas. His father played college football for the UTEP Miners at the University of Texas, El Paso. His mom a beloved Nurse in Baytown, TX. Brian Johnson attended Robert E. Lee High School, where he lettered in football and basketball. During his senior year in 2003, in which he took over starting quarterback duties from Drew Tate, Johnson passed for 2,900 yards and 33 touchdowns, completed 71.6% of his passes, and rushed for 540 yards and 12 touchdowns. Johnson was named the district Most Valuable Player, first-team all-district, and second-team all-state.

After graduating early from Robert E. Lee High School Johnson was a two-star recruit coming out of high school, and not ranked among the top quarterback prospects of his class. Johnson was recruited by Utah, Illinois and Louisiana Tech.

Playing career

College
As a true freshman in 2004, Johnson saw action in ten games as back-up to Heisman Trophy finalist Alex Smith. He passed for a touchdown and ran for another, and compiled a 129.7 passer rating.

In 2005, Johnson took over the starting quarterback position, where he remained for the first ten games until a season-ending knee injury against New Mexico on November 12. He threw for 2,892 yards and 18 touchdowns. Against Wyoming, he was named the Mountain West Conference (MWC) Offensive Player of the Week for completing 32 of 45 passes for 384 yards and four touchdowns and rushing for 67 yards and a touchdown. He was first in the MWC and fourth nationwide in total offensive yards with an average 337.0 yards per game. He was second in the MWC in passing yardage with 289.2 yards per game. The Utes record with Johnson at quarterback in 2005 was 5–5, before ultimately finishing the season 7–5.

After surgery on December 1, 2005 to correct his knee injury, Johnson redshirted his third year in order to convalesce during the 2006 season. In 2007, Johnson returned to see action in 11 games, ten of which were starts. In the first game of the season against Oregon State, he injured his shoulder and subsequently missed two following games. During the season, he threw for 2,636 yards and 24 touchdowns. In the 2007 Poinsettia Bowl against Navy, Johnson completed 20 out of 25 passes for 226 yards and a touchdown and rushed for 69 yards and one touchdown. For his performance, he was named the 2007 Poinsettia Bowl Most Valuable Player.

In 2008, Johnson returned as the Utes' starting quarterback for his final season. In the first game against Rich Rodriguez's Michigan, he threw for 305 yards in Utah's 25–23 win. They went on to compile wins against Air Force, Oregon State (who the previous week defeated USC), and then 12th-ranked TCU, a team that only had one other loss in the season against future BCS Championship Game participants second-ranked Oklahoma. In their final regular season game against 14th-ranked BYU, Johnson threw for 303 yards and four touchdowns in a 48–24 victory. Utah's performance was good enough to secure a sixth-ranked ranking the Bowl Championship Series (BCS) poll and the only BCS non-AQ conference team to secure a berth in a BCS game, the 2009 Sugar Bowl, against Southeastern Conference (SEC) Western Division champions Alabama. Alabama had previously been 12–0 and ranked #1 in all the major polls before a defeat in the SEC Championship Game against Florida. In the Sugar Bowl, Johnson led then seventh-ranked Utah with 336 passing yards and three passing touchdowns in a 31–17 surprise upset over fourth-ranked Alabama. For his performance, Johnson was named the 2009 Sugar Bowl Most Outstanding Player. Utah finished the season as the only undefeated team with a 13–0 record. Johnson was featured as the cover athlete of the PlayStation 3 edition of the NCAA Football 10 video game.

Johnson went 26-7 as a starting quarterback in his career at Utah and finished as the winningest quarterback in school history.

College statistics

Professional
After going undrafted in the 2009 NFL Draft, he was invited to the Green Bay Packers rookie mini-camp along with Tulsa quarterback David Johnson. He was not subsequently signed by an NFL team, but the Winnipeg Blue Bombers of the Canadian Football League were reportedly interested in him.

Johnson was selected in the inaugural United Football League (UFL) draft by the New York Sentinels. Johnson had said at UFL tryouts, "It's a chance to keep playing football ... You have to take every opportunity you can get. You have to keep knocking on doors. You have to show them you can compete, that you have the physical tools they want." He signed with the team on August 5, 2009, but was released on September 28, 2009.

Coaching career

Utah
In January 2010, at 23 years of age, Johnson was named the quarterbacks coach at the University of Utah by head coach Kyle Whittingham. On February 2, 2012, two weeks before his 25th birthday, Johnson was named offensive coordinator at Utah by Whittingham.

Mississippi State
On February 10, 2014, Johnson was named as the quarterbacks coach at Mississippi State reuniting him with coach Dan Mullen who offered him a scholarship to sign with Utah during Urban Meyer's tenure as the Utes head football coach.

Houston
On December 27, 2016, Johnson was hired as the offensive coordinator and quarterbacks coach at the University of Houston.

Florida
On December 10, 2017, Johnson was hired as the quarterbacks coach at the University of Florida, reuniting with head coach Dan Mullen. Prior to the 2020 season, Johnson was promoted to offensive coordinator, making him the first African-American offensive coordinator in team history.

Philadelphia Eagles
On January 27, 2021, Johnson was hired by the Philadelphia Eagles as their quarterbacks coach under head coach Nick Sirianni.

On February 28, 2023, Johnson was promoted to offensive coordinator, replacing Shane Steichen, who departed to become head coach of the Indianapolis Colts.

References

External links
 Philadelphia Eagles profile
Utah Utes profile (archived webpage)

1987 births
Living people
American football quarterbacks
Florida Gators football coaches
Houston Cougars football coaches
Mississippi State Bulldogs football coaches
National Football League offensive coordinators
New York Sentinels players
People from Baytown, Texas
Philadelphia Eagles coaches
Players of American football from Texas
Sportspeople from Harris County, Texas
Utah Utes football coaches
Utah Utes football players
African-American players of American football
African-American coaches of American football
21st-century African-American sportspeople
20th-century African-American people